Sodium calcium edetate (sodium calcium EDTA), also known as edetate calcium disodium among other names, is a medication primarily used to treat lead poisoning, including both short-term and long-term lead poisoning. Sodium calcium edetate came into medical use in the United States in 1953.

Chelation agent

Sodium calcium edetate is in the chelating agent family of medication. It is a salt of edetate with two sodium and one calcium atoms.
It works by binding to a number of heavy metals, which renders them almost inert and allows them to leave the body in the urine.

Edetate disodium is a different formulation which does not have the same effects.

Medical use
Sodium calcium edetate's primary use is to treat lead poisoning,
for which it is an alternative to succimer.
It is given by slow injection into a vein or into a muscle.

For lead encephalopathy sodium calcium edetate is typically used together with dimercaprol.
It may also be used to treat plutonium poisoning.
It does not appear to be useful for poisoning by tetra-ethyl lead.

Side effects 
Common side effects include pain at the site of injection. Other side effects may include kidney problems, diarrhea, fever, muscle pains, and low blood pressure. Benefits when needed in pregnancy are likely greater than the risks.

History 
Sodium calcium edetate came into medical use in the United States in 1953. It is on the World Health Organization's List of Essential Medicines.

References

External links 
 

Calcium compounds
Chelating agents used as drugs
Organic sodium salts
World Health Organization essential medicines